Norton Lindsey is a village and civil parish in Warwickshire, England, 3.5 miles south-west of the tourist and county town of Warwick and a mile west of the M40 motorway. At the 2011 census, the parish had a population of 326. The village takes its name from the Lindsey family who were lords of the manor in the 12th century. The parish church of the Holy Trinity dates from the following century. The village has a windmill. Two of the village's other prominent features are the Village Hall and the cricket club, which is shared with nearby Wolverton. The village also has its own  Brownie pack.

References

External links

Villages in Warwickshire
Civil parishes in Warwickshire
Warwick District